 

The West London Free School is an English free school for girls and boys aged 11 to 18. It was co-founded by Toby Young and opened in 2011.

It is located in Hammersmith in west London and was the first free school of its type in England to sign a Funding Agreement with the Secretary of State for Education.

The West London Free School offers children a classical liberal education and is a music specialist school, with more than half the pupils learning a musical instrument. Its production of Sweeney Todd in the summer of 2015 enjoyed a short, sell-out run at the Bush Theatre.

History
The school was formally opened by Mayor of London Boris Johnson in September 2011 and is currently home to 600 pupils. It received over 1,000 applicants for its last 120 places, making it one of the most oversubscribed taxpayer-funded schools in England.

The school's first headteacher was Thomas Packer, who served in post from September 2011 to December 2012, before becoming education director of the charitable trust that set up the school. Sam Naismith, a former England hockey coach, was then Headteacher from January 2013 until May 2014. Dame Sally Coates, ex-principal of Burlington Danes Academy, looked after the school, alongside David Stanton, while a permanent head was chosen. Hywel Jones was appointed as  headteacher from September 2014 to December 2017. Hywel Jones was formerly an assistant headteacher at St. Mary's Catholic School in Bishop’s Stortford. In January 2018, Clare Wagner became the school's headteacher until April 2021. In April 2021, Ben McLaughlin and Robert Peal became joint headteachers

The school was inspected by Ofsted in 2013 and 2017 and judged to be good.

In 2013 it was reported that "the school's traditional, academic focus is popular with parents", despite the issues with leadership turnover and with school buildings. All pupils studied Latin until age 14, and were entered for eight academic GCSEs.

In 2013 the West London Free School Primary was opened, starting with two Reception classes of 30 pupils each. In 2014, the West London Free School Academy Trust opened the Earls Court Free School Primary, which is currently co-located with the West London Free School Primary, but will move to Earls Court in 2020. In 2016, the Trust opened the Kensington Primary Academy.

The secondary school is based at Palingswick House on King Street in Hammersmith. In May 2014 the Trust purchased an office block on nearby Bridge Avenue for £9.25 million. This building is now Franklin House, the school's sixth form. Initially, the secondary school was based in Cambridge Grove, Hammersmith, before moving to its current location, with the West London Free School Primary and Earls Court Primary Free School also sharing the Cambridge Grove site.

The founding teachers of WLFS 2011:

Wavell Blades (RE and History)

Edward Watkins (Music)

Deborah Halifax (English)

Lilly Akseth (Art and History of Art)

Rebecca Can (Classics)

Katherine Holliday (Science)

David Stanton (Maths)

GCSE Results
The school posted its first set of GCSE results in August, 2016. Seventy-seven per cent of the pupils obtained five GCSEs marked A* to C, including English and Mathematics. Thirty-eight per cent of all the GCSEs taken were marked A* or A, with 63% marked A* to B. In Mathematics, 85% of pupils achieved A* to C, with 37% getting A* or A. In English Literature, 79% of pupils achieved A* to C, with 44% getting A* or A. One hundred per cent of pupils who took all three sciences achieved A* to C, with 75% getting an average grade of A* or A. One hundred per cent of pupils who took Music achieved A* to C, with 57% getting A* or A. One hundred per cent of pupils who took Art achieved A* to C, with 33% getting A* or A. Ninety-five per cent of pupils who took RE achieved A* to C, with 67% getting A* or A. The Best Eight score for the cohort is 5.9.

Criticism
In addition to criticism of the free school concept generally, the West London Free School was criticised in The Guardian for planning to make its permanent site Palingswick House in Hammersmith, a building then occupied by a number of community groups. Hammersmith MP Andy Slaughter added his voice to the criticism, arguing that "local people are against the plans", and stating that the school was "ousting 22 charities and a school for severely disabled children in its rush to open".

In response, Toby Young pointed out that Palingswick House was listed for disposal by Hammersmith and Fulham Borough Council long before the West London Free School came into existence and, had the school not subsequently bought it, it would likely have been sold off to a property developer and possibly demolished. There hasn't been a school for disabled children in Palingswick House for at least 50 years.

Opponents of free schools have also challenged perceived shortcomings in freedom of information access related to the development of free schools including the West London Free School.

Peter Winter, the ex-headmaster of Latymer Upper School, criticised the proposal to base the West London Free School at Palingswick House, a neighbouring property, on the grounds that increased traffic to the area might threaten pupil safety.

The school has been accused of being unrepresentative of the local community, but these charges have been denied by Young, saying that approximately 25 per cent of the pupils are on free school meals.

External links 

West London Free School Primary

Secondary schools in the London Borough of Hammersmith and Fulham
Free schools in London
Educational institutions established in 2011
2011 establishments in England